The 2016–17 Indiana State Sycamores basketball team represented Indiana State University during the 2016–17 NCAA Division I men's basketball season. The Sycamores, led by seventh-year head coach Greg Lansing, played their home games at the Hulman Center in Terre Haute, Indiana and were members of the Missouri Valley Conference. They finished the season 11–20, 5–13 to finish in a tie for ninth place in MVC play. They lost in the first round of the Missouri Valley Conference tournament to Evansville.

Previous season 
The Sycamores finished the 2015–16 season 15–17, 8–10 in MVC play to finish in a tie for sixth place. They defeated Illinois State in the quarterfinals of the Missouri Valley tournament to advance to the semifinals where they lost to Evansville.

Preseason 
The Sycamores were picked to finish third in the preseason MVC poll. Brenton Scott was selected to the preseason's All-MVC team.

Offseason

Departures

Incoming transfers

2016 recruiting class

Roster

Schedule and results

|-
!colspan=9 style=| Exhibition

|-
!colspan=9 style=| Non-conference regular season

|-
!colspan=9 style=| Missouri Valley Conference regular season

|-
!colspan=9 style=| Missouri Valley tournament

References

Indiana State Sycamores men's basketball seasons
Indiana State
2016 in sports in Indiana
2017 in sports in Indiana